Karen Linnea Anderson (married Oldham; born April 5, 1938) is a retired American javelin thrower who won a gold medal at the 1955 Pan American Games and set four national records, in 1955, 1956, and twice in 1960. She competed at the 1956 and 1960 Summer Olympics and finished in 8th and 13th place, respectively.

After marrying Ned Oldham, an Akron attorney, she moved to Akron, where she worked with developmentally disabled children, and was involved with athletics programs and a Presbyterian Church. She also became a leading American senior golfer, finishing third at the 1995 national championships and tying for second place in 1996. In 1996 she was part of the American team that won the Senior Women's International Team Championships.

References

1938 births
Living people
Track and field athletes from Denver
American female javelin throwers
Olympic track and field athletes of the United States
Athletes (track and field) at the 1956 Summer Olympics
Athletes (track and field) at the 1960 Summer Olympics
Pan American Games medalists in athletics (track and field)
Pan American Games gold medalists for the United States
Athletes (track and field) at the 1955 Pan American Games
University of Pennsylvania alumni
Medalists at the 1955 Pan American Games
21st-century American women